Marie Guillard (born 20 June 1972) is a French actress. She was born in the Paris suburb of Neuilly-sur-Seine.

Personal life 
She was married to Nicola Sirkis from July 1995 until November 1998. Presently she is married to Samy Naceri.

Filmography

External links

Marie Guillard on ActricesdeFrance.org

1972 births
20th-century French actresses
21st-century French actresses
French film actresses
French television actresses
Living people
People from Neuilly-sur-Seine